Gabby Rivera is an American writer and storyteller. She is the author of the 2016 young adult novel Juliet Takes a Breath, and wrote the 2017–2018 Marvel comic book America, about superhero America Chavez. Her work often addresses issues of identity and representation for people of color and the queer community, within American popular culture.

Early life and education 
Gabby Rivera was born to Martha and Charles Rivera. Rivera grew up in the Bronx borough of New York City, she is of Puerto Rican descent and grew up in a religious household of Pentecostal evangelicalism. An early love of reading and writing came from her mother, a kindergarten teacher. Rivera attended an all-girls private school in White Plains, New York. Gabby Rivera attended Goucher College in Towson, Maryland, graduating in 2004.

Career 
Gabby Rivera started her career and love for literature at the age of 17 by attending a local cafe for poetry nights. Starting her career in performance poetry, Rivera grew inspired by stories written by black, brown and queer authors. Rivera is an editor at Autostraddle, an online magazine for, about, and written by LGBTQIA+ women, non-binary people and sometimes trans men. Rivera has also written poems and short stories. She is an activist and youth mentor through her work as the youth programs manager at GLSEN.

Juliet Takes a Breath (2016) 
Juliet Takes a Breath (2016) is a semi-autobiographical, fictional coming-of-age novel about a gay Latina woman dealing with her identity. In this story, Juliet Milagros Palante is attending college in Baltimore and moves to Portland, Oregon for the summer to intern under Harlowe Brisbane, a white feminist writer and author of, "Raging Flower: Empowering Your Pussy by Empowering Your Mind". Juliet realizes there is a difference in theoretical definition between Harlowe's white feminism and her own, because she cannot fully identify because she is someone of a different race, culture, and sexual orientation. Juliet is learning to trust her own power and seeks to fill the gap between the feminist community and her Latino culture, in the creation of her own identity. This narrative story addresses issues of representation and multigenerational cultural differences.

Miss America (America Chavez) series 

Miss America is a fictional superhero appearing in American comic books published by Marvel Comics and Marvel's first Latin-American LGBTQ character to star in an ongoing series. From March 2017 to April 2018, Gabby Rivera authored the series, until it was cancelled by Marvel publishing.

B.B. Free series 
B.B. Free is a comic book series based on a short story written by Rivera titled IMBALANCE, the story centers around a 15 year old navigating a post-climate change world with a plague, where mother nature kills greed.

Personal life 
Rivera is openly gay.

Publications

References

External links 
 Gabby Rivera's speakers profile on Ted.com
 Gabby Rivera's contributors profile on Autostraddle

Writers from the Bronx
Year of birth missing (living people)
Living people
Goucher College alumni
Hispanic and Latino American novelists
Hispanic and Latino American poets
Hispanic and Latino American short story writers
Hispanic and Latino American autobiographers
American autobiographers
Women autobiographers
21st-century American women writers
American magazine editors
Women magazine editors
American women short story writers
American women poets
21st-century American short story writers
21st-century American poets
Marvel Comics writers
Marvel Comics people
American lesbian writers
LGBT people from New York (state)
LGBT Hispanic and Latino American people
American LGBT novelists
American LGBT poets
LGBT comics creators